The 2008 Vanderbilt Commodores football team represented Vanderbilt University during the 2008–09 college football season. The team's head coach was Bobby Johnson, who served his seventh season in the position.  The Commodores played their six home games at Vanderbilt Stadium at Dudley Field in Nashville, Tennessee.

This was Vanderbilt's first 5–0 start since 1943 and first bowl appearance since 1982, ending a streak of 25 straight losing seasons.

Schedule

Season summary
Following a 4–0 start to the season, the Vanderbilt Commodores were ranked for the first time on the AP Poll since 1984. Following the victory over Auburn, the Commodores were 5–0 for the first time since 1943. After the good start, the Commodores would lose their next four games before a 31-24 victory over Kentucky that declared them bowl eligible for the first time since 1982. Vandy would then lose their final two games of the regular season. They ended the season by going to the Music City Bowl where they defeated Boston College by a score of 16-14, ending a 53-year bowl victory drought.

Game summaries

Miami (OH)

South Carolina

Rice

Ole Miss

Auburn 

This game was notably broadcast on ESPN's national television program College GameDay.

Mississippi State

Georgia

Duke

Florida

Kentucky

Tennessee

Wake Forest

Boston College

Coaching staff
Bobby Johnson - Head Coach
Ted Cain - Offensive Coordinator and Tight Ends Coach
Bruce Fowler - Defensive Coordinator
Robbie Caldwell - Assistant Head Coach/Offensive Line Coach
Rick Logo - Defensive Line Coach
Warren Belin - Linebackers Coach and Recruiting Coordinator
Jamie Bryant - Defensive Backs Coach and Special Teams Coordinator
Charlie Fisher - Co-Passing Game Coordinator & Wide Receivers
Jacob DeLucia - Co-Passing Game Coordinator & Quarterbacks
Desmond Kitchings- Running Backs Coach
Michael Hazel - Assistant Director of Football Operations
Joey Orck - Offensive Quality Control
Andy Frank - Defensive Quality Control
Norval McKenzie - Offensive Graduate Assistant
Mark Moehring - Defensive Graduate Assistant
Tom Bossung - Head Athletic Trainer
Brian Reese - Associate Director of Student Athletics
John Sisk - Director of Speed, Strength and Conditioning
Luke Wyatt - Head Equipment Manager
Gary Veach - Assistant Equipment Manager

References

Vanderbilt
Vanderbilt Commodores football seasons
Music City Bowl champion seasons
Vanderbilt Commodores football